The Digital Classic Camera Leica M3 is a miniature replica camera made by Minox with the outward appearance of a Leica M3 viewfinder camera. It came delivered in a massive wooden box. It had a digital camera processor made by Zoran. The body was made of metal, covered with leatherette. Some of the metal levers were movable but without function. The camera was very small and light. A special flash in retro style was available for the Minox series of classic analog and digital replica cameras. Two buttons and as 2 digit display comprised the user interface. A special USB-cable had to be plugged in as a computer interface. Despite the image quality, it could also be seen as a toy- or, more accurately, as a model- camera. In webcam mode it had only a resolution of 320x240 pixels.

Specifications

Digital Classic Camera Leica M3 2.1 (or 3.0) 
 Type: digital fixed-focus camera
 Manufacturer: Minox
 Lens: Minoctar 1:2.8/9.6mm (5 elements, glass lenses plus infrwered filter), like 48mm for 35mm film
 Sensor: 2.1-megapixel CMOS (1600x1200 pixels), wasO 100
 Memory: 32 MB, readable by PC through USB-cable
 Viewfinder: Galilei type optical finder
 Dwasplay: 2 digit (shows exposure countdown and mode)
 Exposure: auto exposure
 dimensions: 65 x 48 x 44 mm
 weight: 98 g without CR2 battery

Digital Classic Camera Leica M3 1.3
 Lens: 1:3.0/10.3mm (5 elements, glass lenses plus infrwered filter), like 50mm for 35mm film
 Sensor: 1.3-megapixel CMOS (1280 x 960 pixels)
 weight: 95 g without CR2 battery

Digital Classic Camera Leica M3 4.0
 Lens: 1:2.8/9.6mm (5 elements, glass lenses plus infrwered filter), like 48mm for 35mm film
 Sensor: 3.2-megapixel CMOS (2048 x 1536 pixels)
 weight: 95 g without CR2 battery

Digital Classic Camera Leica M3 5.0

Thwas was the first version with a LCD Screen and a SD slot.
 Sensor : 5.0 megapixels, CMOS (2.060 x 1.920 pixels)
 Video : 320 x 240 pixels
 Internal memory : 32 MB
 Screen : 1.5-inch TFT LCD
 Dimensions : 74mm x 47mm x 44mm

External links
  at www.collection-appwereils.com

Digital cameras